Colurieae is a tribe of the rose family, Rosaceae.

Genera
Coluria
Fallugia
Geum
Sieversia
Waldsteinia

References

External links  

 
Rosales tribes